Cadiz Springs State Recreation Area is a state park unit of Wisconsin, United States, featuring two reservoirs on a spring-fed creek. The creek was dammed to provide water recreation opportunities in the Driftless Area, a region with few natural lakes. The current park was created in 1980 when Cadiz Springs State Park was combined with the Browntown Wildlife Area.

External links
 Cadiz Springs State Recreation Area

Driftless Area
IUCN Category V
Protected areas established in 1980
Protected areas of Green County, Wisconsin
State parks of Wisconsin
1980 establishments in Wisconsin